Bunker Ramo Corporation, often shortened to Bunker Ramo, was an American electronics company based in Trumbull, Connecticut. It was founded by George M. Bunker and Simon Ramo in 1964, jointly owned by Martin-Marietta and Thompson Ramo Wooldridge (TRW). The holdings of Teleregister Corporation became part of the new company.

It became a manufacturer of military electronics devices and digital computers including the transistorized BR-133 of 1964, given the military designation AN/UYK-3. It was a supplier of video display terminals to the financial industry.  In 1967 the Amphenol corporation (a manufacturer of electrical connectors) merged with Bunker Ramo. The combined company peaked at number 338 on the Fortune 500 list in 1969.

In February 1971, the firm unveiled the first version of the National Association of Securities Dealers' Automated Quotations system, NASDAQ.

In 1981, it was purchased by Allied Corporation, later AlliedSignal.  It is now part of the Honeywell group.

Notes

References

External links
 Bitsavers.org: Bunker-Ramo Newsletter (February 1964) — press release for new company.

1964 establishments in Connecticut
1981 disestablishments in Connecticut
1981 mergers and acquisitions
American companies disestablished in 1981
American companies established in 1964
Companies based in Fairfield County, Connecticut
Computer companies disestablished in 1981
Computer companies established in 1964
Defense companies of the United States
Defunct computer companies of the United States
Defunct computer hardware companies
Defunct electronics companies
Electronics companies disestablished in 1981
Electronics companies established in 1964
Electronics companies of the United States
Honeywell
Manufacturing companies based in Connecticut
Manufacturing companies disestablished in 1981
Manufacturing companies established in 1964
Technology companies disestablished in 1981
Technology companies established in 1964
Trumbull, Connecticut
TRW Inc.